Siga Arles (12 November 1950 – 5 June 2015) was an Indian missiologist and founder of the Centre for Contemporary Christianity (Bangalore, India).

Biography 
Arles completed his BSc from University of Mysore, followed by an M.Div. and an MAR from Asbury Theological Seminary. In 1990, he completed a Ph.D. at the University of Aberdeen at the Centre for the Study of Christianity in the Non-Western World, where he co-studied with G. D. V. Prasad, then pursuing doctoral studies in the same university in the discipline of Old Testament.

In his academic career, he served as the vice-principal and head of the department of theology at North India Institute of Post Graduate Theological Studies, as theological secretary of Evangelical Fellowship of India, as dean of Consortium for Indian Missiological Education, and as founder and director of the Centre for Contemporary Christianity. From 2002 to 2008, he also served as co-editor of Journal of Asian Evangelical Theology, a journal of the Asia Theological Association based in Singapore.

Arles died on June 5, 2015, of a heart attack.

Works

References

Further reading

See also
 Centre for the Study of World Christianity
 North India Institute of Post Graduate Theological Studies

1950 births
2015 deaths
Indian Christian theologians
Christian clergy from Karnataka
Kannada people
20th-century Protestant religious leaders
Senate of Serampore College (University) alumni
Academic staff of the Senate of Serampore College (University)
University of Mysore alumni
Alumni of the University of Aberdeen